Margaritifer Terra is an ancient, heavily cratered region of Mars. The area reveals "chaos terrain", outflow channels, and alluvial plains that are indicative of massive flooding. Wind erosion patterns are also in evidence. A region within the terra shows some of the highest valley network densities on the planet. Ares Vallis is another notable feature, where the flood and flow patterns are in evidence; it was the landing site of the Soviet Mars 6 lander and NASA's Mars Pathfinder. It is also one of several proposed landing sites for the Mars 2020 Rover.

Holden and Eberswalde, craters in Margaritifer Terra, are thought to have formerly held lakes because they contain deltas and iron/magnesium smectite minerals which need water to form.  The Uzboi-Landon-Morava (ULM) system of paths for water flow is found in Margaritifer Terra. Researchers think that great flood channels in this region were carved quickly in just weeks or months by catastrophic outflows of groundwater. Because forming hematite requires liquid water, which could not long exist without a thick atmosphere, Mars must have had a much thicker atmosphere at some time in the past.

Margaritifer Terra was named in 1979, after the Pearl Coast, south India.  Part of it is found in the Margaritifer Sinus quadrangle and part in the Oxia Palus quadrangle.

Layers

Some of the images from this region display layers.  Many places on Mars show rocks arranged in layers. Rock can form layers in a variety of ways.  Volcanoes, wind, or water can produce layers. A detailed discussion of layering with many Martian examples can be found in Sedimentary Geology of Mars.

Layers can be hardened by the action of groundwater.  Martian ground water probably moved hundreds of kilometers, and in the process it dissolved many minerals from the rock it passed through.  When ground water surfaces in low areas containing sediments, water evaporates in the thin atmosphere and leaves behind minerals as deposits and/or cementing agents. Consequently, layers of dust could not later easily erode away since they were cemented together.

On April 1, 2010, NASA released the first images under the HiWish program, with the public suggesting places for HiRISE to photograph. One of the eight locations was Aureum Chaos.  The first image below gives a wide view of the area.  The next two images are from the HiRISE image.

Yardangs

Other images of Margaritifer Terra

See also
Areas of chaos terrain on Mars
Geography of Mars
Groundwater on Mars
Lakes on Mars
Uzboi-Landon-Morava (ULM)
 Dartmouth
 Astrobio.net
 J.A. Grant, 'Valley Evolution in Margaritifer Sinus, Mars'
 Geologic Map of MTM -15027, -20027, -25027, and -25032 Quadrangles, Margaritifer Terra Region of Mars United States Geological Survey

References

External links
 Lakes on Mars - Nathalie Cabrol (SETI Talks)

Terrae on Mars
Margaritifer Sinus quadrangle
Oxia Palus quadrangle